Heritage Field may refer to:

Yankee Stadium (1923), or a park that now exists on its former site, Bronx, New York
Heritage Field Airport, Montgomery County, Pennsylvania
A former name for Adelanto Stadium, Adelanto, California